Arai–Samaia is a language family of New Guinea, proposed by Timothy Usher, that includes the Arai (Left May) and Samaia (Amto–Musan) languages and the Pyu isolate.

Arai and Samaia Rivers
Arai River
Ama
Nimo–Nakwi
Owiniga
West Arai River
Pyu
Samaia River
Amto
Musan

References

Further reading
Conrad, R. and Dye, W. "Some Language Relationships in the Upper Sepik Region of Papua New Guinea". In Conrad, R., Dye, W., Thomson, N. and Bruce Jr., L. editors, Papers in New Guinea Linguistics No. 18. A-40:1-36. Pacific Linguistics, The Australian National University, 1975. 

 
Language families
Papuan languages